The Venezuela women's national football team represents Venezuela in international women's football.

Team image

Home stadium

Venezuela women's national football team plays its home matches on the Estadio José Antonio Anzoátegui, Polideportivo Cachamay or Estadio Polideportivo de Pueblo Nuevo.

Results and fixtures

The following is a list of match results in the last 12 months, as well as any future matches that have been scheduled.

Legend

2022

2023

 Venezuela Results and Fixtures – Soccerway.com

Coaching staff

Current coaching staff

Manager history

Only counts official FIFA matches

Players

Current squad
The following players were called up for the friendly matches against Panama on 10 November 2022 and Scotland on 14 November 2022.
Information correct as of 14 November 2022.

Recent call-ups
The following players have been called up in the last 12 months.

Competitive record

FIFA Women's World Cup

*Draws include knockout matches decided on penalty kicks.

Olympic Games

*Draws include knockout matches decided on penalty kicks.

CONMEBOL Copa América Femenina

*Draws include knockout matches decided on penalty kicks.

Pan American Games

*Draws include knockout matches decided on penalty kicks.

Central American and Caribbean Games

*Draws include knockout matches decided on penalty kicks.

South American Games

*Draws include knockout matches decided on penalty kicks.

Bolivarian Games

*Draws include knockout matches decided on penalty kicks.

Other tournaments

Torneio Internacional de Futebol Feminino

See also

Sport in Venezuela
Football in Venezuela
Women's football in Venezuela
Venezuela women's national under-20 football team
Venezuela women's national under-17 football team
Venezuela men's national football team

References

External links
Official website
FIFA profile

 
South American women's national association football teams